Esendoruk is a village in the Çayırlı District, Erzincan Province, Turkey. The village is populated by Kurds of the Kurêşan tribe and had a population of 19 in 2021.

The hamlet of Kütüklü is attached to the village.

References 

Villages in Çayırlı District
Kurdish settlements in Erzincan Province